Francis R. Dillon is a retired United States Air Force brigadier general (Special Agent) who served as the 11th Commander of the Air Force Office of Special Investigations (AFOSI), Bolling AFB, Washington, D.C. As the AFOSI Commander, Dillon was responsible for providing commanders of all Air Force activities independent professional investigative services regarding fraud, counterintelligence and major criminal matters by using a worldwide network of agents stationed at all major Air Force installations and a variety of special operating locations.

Education
Through the Reserve Officer Training Corps, Dillon earned a Bachelor of Science degree from the University of Connecticut. Dillon also has a master's degree from Troy State University. He also completed courses at Squadron Officer School, Air Command and Staff College, Air War College, and the Defense Language Institute.

Military career
Upon graduation from the University of Connecticut, Dillon commissioned into the United States Air Force in 1968. He spent the majority of his career as a special agent of the AFOSI, where he conducted and supervised felony-level criminal, fraud, and counterintelligence investigations and operations. He commanded at the detachment, squadron and wing levels. His assignments included two overseas postings, which were Munich and Wiesbaden, Germany. Additionally, Dillon served as an assistant professor of aerospace studies with the Air Force Reserve Officer Training Corps at Rutgers University, New Brunswick, N.J. Prior to his last assignment as Commander of AFOSI, Dillon served as the Vice Commander of AFOSI.

As Commander of AFOSI, Dillon was interviewed by The Washington Post about an Air Force captain allegedly spying for U.S. adversaries in West Berlin, Germany. When asked by reporters to clarify if an investigation was ongoing, Dillon told reporters, "This was very premature, this should have never been leaked out." Pentagon officials also described previous news reports on the matter, as premature and misleading; however, an Air Force spokesperson emphasized a "full and thorough investigation" of the matter was under way.

Major awards and decorations 
Dillon is the recipient of the following:

Post-Military Career
Since retirement, Dillon has published a book, served on local community boards, and lobbied members of the U.S. Congress to name a few. For instance, Dillon published Vacationland Terrorists: Alarm in the Countryside in 2014. Additionally, he serves on the Bath Housing Authority Board of Directors with a term expiring in 2021. Dillon, along with several other retired military generals, supported the "2010 Healthy, Hunger-Free Kids Act" and urged members of Congress to refrain from pursuing any mechanism that would weaken or delay its standards.

See also
 List of Commanders of the Air Force Office of Special Investigations

References

Notes 

United States Air Force Office of Special Investigations
University of Connecticut alumni
Living people
United States Air Force generals
Troy University alumni
Recipients of the Legion of Merit
Year of birth missing (living people)